Lenise Marais (born 29 April 1985) is a South African field hockey player who competed in the 2008 and 2012 Summer Olympics. She coached the South African under-21 national team at the 2021 Junior World Cup.

References

External links

1985 births
Living people
South African female field hockey players
Olympic field hockey players of South Africa
Field hockey players at the 2008 Summer Olympics
Field hockey players at the 2012 Summer Olympics
Field hockey players at the 2006 Commonwealth Games
Commonwealth Games competitors for South Africa
Field hockey players at the 2014 Commonwealth Games
21st-century South African women